This page lists all described species of the spider family Ochyroceratidae accepted by the World Spider Catalog :

A

† Aculeatosoma

† Aculeatosoma Wunderlich, 2017 - Psilodercinae
 † A. pyritmutatio Wunderlich, 2017

† Arachnolithulus

† Arachnolithulus Wunderlich, 1988
 † A. longipes Wunderlich, 2004 
 † A. pygmaeus Wunderlich, 1988

D

Dundocera

Dundocera Machado, 1951
 D. angolana (Machado, 1951) — Angola
 D. fagei Machado, 1951 (type) — Angola
 D. gabelensis (Machado, 1951) — Angola

E

Euso

Euso Saaristo, 2001
 E. muehlenbergi (Saaristo, 1998) (type) — Seychelles

F

Fageicera

Fageicera Dumitrescu & Georgescu, 1992
 F. cubana Dumitrescu & Georgescu, 1992 (type) — Cuba
 F. loma Dumitrescu & Georgescu, 1992 — Cuba
 F. matarredondensis Cuervo & Buitrago, 2017 — Colombia
 F. nasuta Dumitrescu & Georgescu, 1992 — Cuba

L

† Leclercera

† Leclercera Deeleman-Reinhold, 1995 - Psilodercinae

Lundacera

Lundacera Machado, 1951
 L. tchikapensis Machado, 1951 (type) — Angola

O

Ochyrocera

Ochyrocera Simon, 1892
Ochyrocera aragogue Brescovit, Cizauskas & Mota, 2018 – Brazil
Ochyrocera arietina Simon, 1892 (type) – Cuba, St. Vincent
Ochyrocera atlachnacha Brescovit, Cizauskas & Mota, 2018 – Brazil
Ochyrocera bicolor González-Sponga, 2001 – Venezuela
Ochyrocera brumadinho Brescovit & Cizauskas, 2018 – Brazil
Ochyrocera cachote Hormiga, Álvarez-Padilla & Benjamin, 2007 – Hispaniola
Ochyrocera caeruleoamethystina Lopez & Lopez, 1997 – French Guiana
Ochyrocera callaina Dupérré, 2015 – Ecuador
Ochyrocera cashcatotoras Dupérré, 2015 – Ecuador
Ochyrocera charlotte Brescovit, Cizauskas & Mota, 2018 – Brazil
Ochyrocera chiapas Valdez-Mondragón, 2009 – Mexico
Ochyrocera coerulea (Keyserling, 1891) – Brazil
Ochyrocera coffeeicola González-Sponga, 2001 – Venezuela
Ochyrocera cornuta Mello-Leitão, 1944 – Brazil
Ochyrocera corozalensis González-Sponga, 2001 – Venezuela
Ochyrocera diablo Pérez-González, Rubio & Ramírez, 2016 – Argentina
Ochyrocera dorinha (Brescovit, Zampaulo, Pedroso & Cizauskas, 2021) – Brazil
Ochyrocera fagei Brignoli, 1974 – Mexico
Ochyrocera formosa Gertsch, 1973 – Guatemala
Ochyrocera garayae Castanheira, Pérez-González, do Prado & Baptista, 2019 – Brazil
Ochyrocera hamadryas Brignoli, 1978 – Brazil
Ochyrocera ibitipoca Baptista, González & Tourinho, 2008 – Brazil
Ochyrocera italoi Dupérré, 2015 – Ecuador
Ochyrocera itatinga Castanheira, Pérez-González, do Prado & Baptista, 2019 – Brazil
Ochyrocera janthinipes Simon, 1893 – Venezuela
Ochyrocera jarocha Valdez-Mondragón, 2017 – Mexico
Ochyrocera juquila Valdez-Mondragón, 2009 – Mexico
Ochyrocera laracna Brescovit, Cizauskas & Mota, 2018 – Brazil
Ochyrocera losrios Dupérré, 2015 – Ecuador
Ochyrocera machadoi (Gertsch, 1977) – Mexico
Ochyrocera magali (Brescovit, Zampaulo, Pedroso & Cizauskas, 2021) – Brazil
Ochyrocera minima González-Sponga, 2001 – Venezuela
Ochyrocera minotaure Dupérré, 2015 – Ecuador
Ochyrocera misspider Brescovit, Cizauskas & Mota, 2018 – Brazil
Ochyrocera monica (Brescovit, Zampaulo, Pedroso & Cizauskas, 2021) – Brazil
Ochyrocera oblita Fage, 1912 – Venezuela
Ochyrocera otonga Dupérré, 2015 – Ecuador
Ochyrocera peruana Ribera, 1978 – Peru
Ochyrocera pojoj Valdez-Mondragón, 2017 – Mexico
Ochyrocera quinquevittata Simon, 1892 – St. Vincent
Ochyrocera ransfordi (Marples, 1955) – Samoa
Ochyrocera rinocerotos Dupérré, 2015 – Ecuador
Ochyrocera ritxoco (Brescovit, Zampaulo & Cizauskas, 2021) – Brazil
Ochyrocera ritxoo (Brescovit, Zampaulo & Cizauskas, 2021) – Brazil
Ochyrocera rosinha (Brescovit, Zampaulo, Pedroso & Cizauskas, 2021) – Brazil
Ochyrocera sandovalae Baert, 2014 – Ecuador
Ochyrocera simoni O. Pickard-Cambridge, 1894 – Mexico
Ochyrocera subparamera González-Sponga, 2001 – Venezuela
Ochyrocera thibaudi Emerit & Lopez, 1985 – Lesser Antilles
Ochyrocera tinocoi Castanheira, Pérez-González, do Prado & Baptista, 2019 – Brazil
Ochyrocera ungoliant Brescovit, Cizauskas & Mota, 2018 – Brazil
Ochyrocera varys Brescovit, Cizauskas & Mota, 2018 – Brazil
Ochyrocera vesiculifera Simon, 1893 – Venezuela
Ochyrocera viridissima Brignoli, 1974 – Brazil
Ochyrocera zabaleta Dupérré, 2015 – Ecuador
Ochyrocera zamora Baert, 2014 – Ecuador

Ouette

Ouette Saaristo, 1998
 O. gyrus Tong & Li, 2007 — China (Hainan)
 O. ouette Saaristo, 1998 (type) — Seychelles

P

† Priscaleclercera

† Priscaleclercera Wunderlich, 2017 - Psilodercinae
 † P. brevispinae Wunderlich, 2017 
 † P. ellenbergeri Wunderlich, 2015 
 † P. longissipes Wunderlich, 2012 
 † P. paucispinae Wunderlich, 2017 
 † P. sexaculeata Wunderlich, 2015 
 † P. spicula Wunderlich, 2012

† Propterpsiloderces

† Propterpsiloderces Wunderlich, 2015 - Psilodercinae
 † P. longisetae Wunderlich, 2015

† Psiloderces

† Psiloderces Simon, 1892 - Psilodercinae

Psiloochyrocera

Psiloochyrocera Baert, 2014
 P. cajanuma Baert, 2014 (type) — Ecuador
 P. tortilis Dupérré, 2015 — Ecuador

R

Roche

Roche Saaristo, 1998
 R. roche Saaristo, 1998 (type) — Seychelles

S

Speocera

Speocera Berland, 1914
 S. amazonica Brignoli, 1978 — Brazil
 S. amber F. Y. Li & S. Q. Li, 2019 — Madagascar
 S. ankalana F. Y. Li & S. Q. Li, 2019 — Madagascar
 S. apo Deeleman-Reinhold, 1995 — Philippines
 S. asymmetrica Tong & Li, 2007 — China (Hainan)
 S. bachma F. Y. Li & S. Q. Li, 2019 — Vietnam
 S. balikpapan F. Y. Li & S. Q. Li, 2019 — Indonesia (Borneo)
 S. ballarini F. Y. Li & S. Q. Li, 2019 — Philippines (Luzon)
 S. bambusicola Brignoli, 1980 — Kenya
 S. batang F. Y. Li & S. Q. Li, 2019 — Indonesia (Sumatra)
 S. bawangling F. Y. Li & S. Q. Li, 2019 — China (Hainan)
 S. berlandi (Machado, 1951) — Angola
 S. bicornea Tong & Li, 2007 — China (Hainan)
 S. bioforestae Dupérré, 2015 — Ecuador
 S. bismarcki (Brignoli, 1976) — Papua New Guinea (Bismarck Arch.)
 S. bontoc F. Y. Li & S. Q. Li, 2019 — Philippines (Luzon)
 S. bosmansi Baert, 1988 — Indonesia (Sulawesi)
 S. bovenlanden Deeleman-Reinhold, 1995 — Indonesia (Sumatra)
 S. bukittinggi F. Y. Li & S. Q. Li, 2019 — Indonesia (Sumatra)
 S. bulbiformis Lin, Pham & Li, 2009 — Vietnam
 S. caeca Deeleman-Reinhold, 1995 — Indonesia (Sulawesi)
 S. capra Deeleman-Reinhold, 1995 — Thailand
 S. cattien F. Y. Li & S. Q. Li, 2019 — Vietnam
 S. crassibulba Deeleman-Reinhold, 1995 — Indonesia (Java)
 S. cucphuong F. Y. Li & S. Q. Li, 2019 — Vietnam
 S. cuyapo F. Y. Li & S. Q. Li, 2019 — Philippines (Luzon)
 S. dayakorum Deeleman-Reinhold, 1995 — Indonesia (Borneo)
 S. debundschaensis Baert, 1985 — Cameroon
 S. decui Dumitrescu & Georgescu, 1992 — Cuba
 S. deharvengi Deeleman-Reinhold, 1995 — Thailand
 S. dongjing F. Y. Li & S. Q. Li, 2019 — China
 S. eleonorae Baptista, 2003 — Brazil
 S. fagei (Berland, 1914) — Kenya
 S. feminina (Machado, 1951) — Angola
 S. gexuejuni F. Y. Li & S. Q. Li, 2019 — China (Hainan)
 S. griswoldi F. Y. Li & S. Q. Li, 2019 — Madagascar
 S. heilan F. Y. Li & S. Q. Li, 2019 — China (Hainan)
 S. huifengi F. Y. Li & S. Q. Li, 2019 — Thailand
 S. huisun F. Y. Li & S. Q. Li, 2019 — Taiwan
 S. indulgens Deeleman-Reinhold, 1995 — Indonesia (Sulawesi)
 S. irritans Brignoli, 1978 — Brazil
 S. jacquemarti Baert & Maelfait, 1986 — Ecuador (Galapagos Is.)
 S. javana (Simon, 1905) — Indonesia (Java), Seychelles
 S. jucunda Brignoli, 1979 — Brazil
 S. karkari (Baert, 1980) — Philippines, Indonesia (Sulawesi), New Guinea
 S. krikkeni Brignoli, 1977 — Indonesia (Sumatra)
 S. lahrak F. Y. Li & S. Q. Li, 2019 — Thailand
 S. laureata Komatsu, 1974 — Japan (Ryukyu Is.)
 S. leclerci Deeleman-Reinhold, 1995 — Thailand
 S. longyan F. Y. Li & S. Q. Li, 2019 — China
 S. manhao F. Y. Li & S. Q. Li, 2019 — China
 S. melinh F. Y. Li & S. Q. Li, 2019 — Vietnam
 S. microphthalma (Simon, 1892) — Philippines
 S. minuta (Marples, 1955) — Samoa, Tokelau, Niue
 S. molesta Brignoli, 1978 — Brazil
 S. musgo Dupérré, 2015 — Ecuador
 S. naumachiae Brignoli, 1980 — Thailand
 S. nuichua F. Y. Li & S. Q. Li, 2019 — Vietnam
 S. octodentis Tong & Li, 2007 — China (Hainan)
 S. onorei Baert, 2014 — Ecuador
 S. pallida Berland, 1914 (type) — East Africa
 S. papuana (Baert, 1980) — New Guinea
 S. parva Deeleman-Reinhold, 1995 — Malaysia (Borneo)
 S. payakumbuh F. Y. Li & S. Q. Li, 2019 — Indonesia (Sumatra)
 S. phangngaensis Deeleman-Reinhold, 1995 — Thailand
 S. pongo Deeleman-Reinhold, 1995 — Indonesia (Borneo)
 S. ranongensis Deeleman-Reinhold, 1995 — Thailand
 S. rjacksoni Barrion, Barrion-Dupo & Heong, 2013 — China (Hainan)
 S. songae Tong & Li, 2007 — China (Hainan)
 S. stellafera Deeleman-Reinhold, 1995 — Thailand, Malaysia
 S. suea F. Y. Li & S. Q. Li, 2019 — Thailand
 S. suratthaniensis Deeleman-Reinhold, 1995 — Thailand
 S. tabuk F. Y. Li & S. Q. Li, 2019 — Philippines (Luzon)
 S. taprobanica Brignoli, 1981 — Sri Lanka
 S. transleuser Deeleman-Reinhold, 1995 — Indonesia (Sumatra)
 S. trapezialis F. Y. Li & S. Q. Li, 2019 — Vietnam
 S. troglobia Deeleman-Reinhold, 1995 — Thailand
 S. trusmadi F. Y. Li & S. Q. Li, 2019 — Malaysia (Borneo)
 S. tubularis F. Y. Li & S. Q. Li, 2019 — Madagascar
 S. vilhenai Machado, 1951 — Angola
 S. violacea Dupérré, 2015 — Ecuador
 S. xiaoxiaoae F. Y. Li & S. Q. Li, 2019 — China (Hainan)
 S. xuanson F. Y. Li & S. Q. Li, 2019 — Vietnam
 S. zhigangi F. Y. Li & S. Q. Li, 2019 — China (Hainan)

T

Theotima

Theotima Simon, 1893
 T. centralis (Gertsch, 1941) — Panama
 T. elva Gertsch, 1977 — Mexico
 T. fallax Fage, 1912 — Cuba, St. Vincent, Venezuela
 T. galapagosensis Baert & Maelfait, 1986 — Ecuador (Galapagos Is.)
 T. jeanneli Machado, 1951 — Angola
 T. kivuensis Machado, 1964 — Congo
 T. lawrencei Machado, 1964 — Congo
 T. makua Gertsch, 1973 — Hawaii
 T. martha Gertsch, 1977 — Mexico
 T. mbamensis Baert, 1985 — Cameroon
 T. minutissima (Petrunkevitch, 1929) — Tropical Asia. Introduced to Guam, Panama, Puerto Rico, Martinique, Germany, Czechia
 T. mirabilis Machado, 1951 — Angola
 T. modesta (Chickering, 1951) — Panama
 T. moxicensis Machado, 1951 — Angola
 T. pura Gertsch, 1973 — Mexico
 T. radiata (Simon, 1892) (type) — Cuba, Puerto Rico, Venezuela
 T. ruina Gertsch, 1977 — Mexico
 T. tchabalensis Baert, 1985 — Cameroon

References

Ochyroceratidae